Daniel P. Kelly is an American physician and Willard and Rhoda Ware Professor of Diabetes and Metabolic Diseases at the University of Pennsylvania. He is known for his contributions to biomedical research.

References

Living people
21st-century American physicians
University of Pennsylvania faculty
University of Illinois College of Medicine alumni
Year of birth missing (living people)